Gerardo Flores (born 1986) of Lufkin, Texas, was convicted in 2005 of two counts of capital murder for giving his girlfriend, who was carrying twins, an at-home abortion the previous year. Prosecutors chose not to seek the death penalty, and so he was sentenced automatically to life in prison without the possibility of parole for 40 years. The conviction and sentence were denounced as the most draconian punishment for abortion in America in decades.

His girlfriend, Erica Basoria, was sixteen years old and five months pregnant at the time. She was unable to get an abortion, so after her own attempts to induce miscarriage failed she called upon Flores to try stepping on her midsection. A week later, she miscarried. Under Texas law, a woman cannot be charged with causing the deaths of her own fetuses, so Flores alone stood trial.

References

External links
 Lufkin Daily News article on Flores' conviction
 Lufkin Daily News article on Flores' appeal

1986 births
American people convicted of murder
Living people
People convicted of murder by Texas
American prisoners sentenced to life imprisonment
Prisoners sentenced to life imprisonment by Texas